Thanya Sridama (born 2 September 1975) is a Thai swimmer. She competed in two events at the 1992 Summer Olympics.

References

1975 births
Living people
Thanya Sridama
Thanya Sridama
Swimmers at the 1992 Summer Olympics
Place of birth missing (living people)